The 1974 Mitsubishi Heavy Industries bombing was a terrorist bombing of the Mitsubishi Heavy Industries headquarters in Tokyo, Japan on 30 August 1974, killing eight people and injuring 376 others. The bombing was committed by the East Asia Anti-Japan Armed Front, a radical far-left anti-Japanese organization, against Mitsubishi Heavy Industries for supplying the United States against North Vietnam during the Vietnam War. 

The 1974 Mitsubishi Heavy Industries bombing was the deadliest terrorist attack in Japan until the Tokyo subway sarin attack in 1995.

Background
The East Asia Anti-Japan Armed Front (EAAJAF) was a Japanese far-left organization, influenced by the New Left movement. Founded in 1972, it espoused a communist anti-Japaneseism ideology, with anarchist leanings. The EAAJAF viewed the Empire of Japan as the "perfect evil" and condemned the Pacific war as an "aggressive war" committed by Japan. In 1971, the EAAJAF's predecessor organization had launched a campaign of non-fatal bombings against the Japanese state, especially targeting symbols associated with Japanese imperialism, but in 1974 escalated its campaign to include the use of violence. 

On 14 August 1974, the EAAJAF tried to blow up the bridge over which Emperor Hirohito's royal train was travelling, which they code-named the "Rainbow Operation", but this was aborted because a member was spotted shortly before it was to be put into action. The following day Mun Se-gwang, a Korean-Japanese member of Chongryon and a far-left militant organization tied to the EAAJAF, attempted to assassinate President Park Chung-hee of South Korea. Despite Mun's failure to kill Park, the attack soured the already fragile Japan–South Korea relations and encouraged the EAAJAF's Wolf cell into committing new terrorist bombings in sympathy with Mun. The EAAJAF targeted Mitsubishi Heavy Industries, a large Japanese corporation which manufactured military weapons that were later used by the United States against North Vietnam in the Vietnam War in the early 1970s.

Bombing
Members of the 'Wolf' cell of EAAJAF planted two powerful home-made time bombs (containing 45 kilograms of explosives) in a flower pot at the entrance of Mitsubishi Heavy Industries' head office block in the busy Marunouchi district of Tokyo. The EAAJAF gave a telephone warning to the people inside the building eight minutes before the explosion, but it was dismissed as a joke, and another warning came four minutes later after the first warning was ignored, but the telephone exchange still did not launch an evacuation procedure. One of the bombs failed to detonate but the other did, exploding at 12:45 p.m. (UTC+9), which was around lunchtime. Eight people died: five people were killed instantly (including two Mitsubishi employees) while another three died after being hospitalized shortly afterwards. An estimated 376 people were injured in the blast, with about 330 people brought to hospital, of which 116 were Mitsubishi employees. Vehicles and some trees in the streets were also destroyed.

Aftermath
The bombing caused a lot more damage than the EAAJAF expected due to the lack of evacuation, causing an outrage among the media. One editor said "This incident is a most atrocious challenge to our society. Society itself was the target and the victim." The Japan Times incited for a "show of public wrath" against the terrorists. However, rightist Prime Minister Kakuei Tanaka as well as leaders of leftist parties remained silent about the incident. Nervousness among the Tokyo population increased following two other bombings carried out by the group in the city in 1974, with the police still not having made arrests.

The members of EAAJAF were arrested on 19 May 1975. In 1987, Masashi Daidoji and Toshiaki Masunaga were convicted and sentenced to death. Daidoji, leader of the former group's Wolf cell, said during court hearings that the bombing was "a mistake". In May 1999 while on death row, he apologized to the victims for the first time, saying "Our causing casualties is not something I can justify. I would like to apologize from the bottom of my heart." Daidoji died on 24 May 2017 at the Tokyo Detention Center.

The 1974 Mitsubishi Heavy Industries bombing was the deadliest terrorist attack as defined by modern standards that had occurred in Japan at the time, and remained the deadliest for over two decades until the Tokyo subway sarin attack on 20 March 1995 which killed 12 people.

See also 
 Bombing of the Fusetsu no Gunzo and Institute of Northern Cultures
 Bombing of the Soji-ji Ossuary

External links
Associated Press video of the bomb's aftermath - YouTube

References 

Explosions in 1974
Shōwa period
History of Tokyo
Mass murder in 1974
Communist terrorist incidents in Asia
Massacres in Japan
Far-left politics in Japan
1974 in Tokyo
Terrorist incidents in Tokyo
August 1974 events in Asia
Terrorist incidents in Japan in 1974
1974 murders in Japan
Vietnam War